The Arakanese National Unity Organisation (ANUO) was a political party in Burma.

History
The party was established in 1955 by members of the Independent Arakanese Parliamentary Group, who held nine seats at the time. In the 1956 elections it opposed the Anti-Fascist People's Freedom League and campaigned with the National United Front. Receiving 1% of the vote, the party won six seats. Prior to the 1960 elections it left the NUF and affiliated with the Clean AFPFL. The elections saw it retain its six seats.

References

Defunct political parties in Myanmar
1955 establishments in Burma
Political parties established in 1955